The International Democratic Education Conference (IDEC) is an annual academic and youth conference hosted by a variety of schools and organizations in cities around the world.

History 

IDEC was first held in 1993, and has been held in all subsequent years except for 2001 (see notes). The length of the conferences has varied between two days for the first event and 15 days in 1997. The purpose of each conference has been decided by the school that is organising it.

Notes:
 IDEC 2001: The conference was to be held jointly and co-hosted by the Institute of Democratic Education in Israel and the Hope Flowers School in Palestine, but the international situation reduced it to a comparatively small event, attended mainly by Israelis, Palestinians and Germans; for that situation they was decided to call this conference the “Israeli Democratic Education Conference”.
 IDEC 2009: The conference was cancelled due to H1N1
 IDEC 2012: For the very first time, the IDEC conference will be held in the Caribbean at Puerto Rico, a Commonwealth (unincorporated territory) of the United States.

See also 
 Summerhill School
 European Democratic Education Conference
 European Democratic Education Community
 Democratic education
 List of democratic schools

External links 
 International Democratic Education Network - further information and a data-base of democratic schools
 IDEC 1999 was held in Summerhill School, England, July 23 to July 26, 1999 (full 100-page report, with texts of all speeches, pictures, workshop reports, a conf diary, & delegate list)
 IDEC 2003 was held in Troy, New York, USA
 IDEC 2004 was held in Bhubaneshwar, India, from Dec 3rd to Dec 12th 2004
 IDEC 2005 was held in Berlin, Germany, July 30 to Aug 7th 2005
 IDEC 2006 was held in Sydney, Australia, July 10 to July 16, 2006
 IDEC 2007 was held in São Paulo, Brazil, September 8 to 16 2007
 IDEC 2008 was held in Vancouver, Canada, August 11 to 18 2008
 IDEC 2009 was officially cancelled but the people already there had a gathering in South Korea, August 2009
 IDEC 2010 was held in Tel-Aviv, Israel, April 6 to 13 2010
 IDEC 2011 was held in Devon, England, July 5 to 14 2011
 IDEC 2012  was held in Caguas, Puerto Rico, March 24 to 28 2012.
 IDEC 2016 was held in Mikkeli, Finland, June 6 to 10 2016.
 IDEC 2017 was held in Hadera, Israel, March 30 to April 3, 2017.
 IDEC 2018 was held in Bangalore, India, November 15 to 21 2018.
 IDEC 2019 was held in Kyiv and Vinnytsia, Ukraine, August 1 to 9 2019.

References

Educational programs
Academic conferences
Youth conferences